The following is a list of FIM Grand Prix motorcycle racing World Champions from 1949, in order of class and year.

Summary
Grand Prix motorcycle racing is the premier championship of motorcycle road racing, which has been divided into three classes: MotoGP, Moto2, and Moto3. Classes that have been discontinued include 500cc, 350cc, 250cc, 125cc, 80cc, 50cc and Sidecar. The Grand Prix Road-Racing World Championship was established in 1949 by the sport's governing body, the Fédération Internationale de Motocyclisme (FIM), and is the oldest motorsport World Championship.

There were five classes when the championship started in 1949; 500cc, 350cc, 250cc, 125cc and sidecar (600cc). The 50cc class was introduced in 1962. Due to escalating costs that resulted in a number of manufacturers leaving the championship, the FIM limited the 50cc bikes to a single cylinder, the 125cc and 250cc bikes were limited to two cylinders and the 350cc and 500cc bikes were limited to four cylinders. The 350cc class was discontinued in 1982, two years later the 50cc class was replaced with an 80cc class, which was discontinued in 1989. The sidecar class left the series to form its own championship after 1996.  In 2002, 990cc bikes replaced the 500c bikes and the class was renamed as MotoGP. 660cc bikes replaced the 250cc bikes in 2010, with the class rebranded as Moto2. Starting 2012, the Moto3 class (250cc one cylinder) replaced the 125cc class.

The 750 FIM Prize became a world championship from 1977 onwards after a favourable vote from the FIM general council.

Sidecars had 600 cc engines in the first two years, after which they were replaced by 500cc engines.  In 1979 the FIM created a prototype sidecar class named B2B, as opposed to the traditional B2A.  Prototypes were banned in 1980, but from 1981 onwards prototypes were allowed again, this time without having a separate class.

The Riders' World Championship is awarded to the most successful rider over a season, as determined by a points system based on Grand Prix results. The constructors listed in this table are the bike that the world champions rode during that winning season and are not necessarily the winner of the constructors' world championship in that season. For sidecar champions, the passenger name is in italics.

List

See also
 List of Grand Prix motorcycle racing World Constructors' Champions
 List of Grand Prix motorcycle racing World Teams' Champions
 Sidecar World Championship

References

External links
The Official MotoGP Website

World Champions
Grand Prix motorcycle racing World Championship riders
Motorcycle